Tare is a surname. Notable people with the surname include:

Aditya Tare (born 1987), Indian cricketer
Avey Tare (born 1979), founding member of the band Animal Collective
Ieva Tāre (born 1974), Latvian women's basketball player
Igli Tare (born 1972), Albanian football player